László Bánhegyi (17 January 1931 – 24 December 2015) was a Hungarian basketball player. He competed in the men's tournament at the 1952 Summer Olympics and the 1960 Summer Olympics.

References

1931 births
2015 deaths
Hungarian men's basketball players
Olympic basketball players of Hungary
Basketball players at the 1952 Summer Olympics
Basketball players at the 1960 Summer Olympics
Basketball players from Budapest